Golgi-specific brefeldin A-resistance guanine nucleotide exchange factor 1 is a protein that in humans is encoded by the GBF1 gene.

References

Further reading